Gerard Patrick Keenan (born 25 July 1954) is an English former footballer who played 240 league and cup games in the English Football League for Bury, Port Vale, and Rochdale from 1975 to 1984. He served Accrington Stanley as player-manager from 1984 to 1986, and later worked as player-manager at Ashton United, Rossendale United and Bacup Borough.

Playing career

Bury
Keenan was a youth team player with Bill Shankly's Liverpool, but never played a first team game at Anfield. He played non-league football for Skelmersdale United, before joining Bobby Smith's Bury in April 1975. The "Shakers" finished 13th in the Third Division in 1975–76, before finishing seventh in 1976–77 and then 15th in 1977–78 under Bob Stokoe's stewardship. In his three years at Gigg Lane, Keenan scored three goals in 71 league games.

Port Vale
Keenan signed with Dennis Butler's Port Vale in September 1978 for a £15,000 fee. His first goal for the "Valiants" came in a 1–0 victory over Rochdale at Spotland on 11 November, and his second goal came on Boxing day in a 6–2 defeat to Barnsley at Oakwell. He ended the 1978–79 season with 32 Fourth Division appearances to his name. He played 44 league and cup games in the 1979–80 campaign, as Vale ended the season in 20th place under John McGrath's stewardship; he scored one goal against Torquay United at Plainmoor. He began suffering with knee injuries from September 1980, and was limited to 13 appearances in the 1980–81 season, claiming two goals in a 4–2 win over Darlington at Vale Park on 20 September, and one goal in a 2–1 defeat at former club Bury seven days later. He played 24 games in the 1981–82 season, and scored one goal in a 2–1 win at Rochdale on 19 September. Due to his knee troubles he was given a free transfer in May 1982.

Management career
He played for Rochdale before becoming the player-manager at North West Counties League Division One side Accrington Stanley. After leaving this position he became player-assistant manager and then player-manager with Ashton United and had two spells as player-manager of Rossendale United before moving on to Bacup Borough and St. Joseph's (also in Rossendale).

Later life
Keenan worked as a gas fitter after ending his playing career. He worked as a matchday ambassador at Vale Park from 2002 to 2011, but quit the club in a row over access to parking. He later returned to the club, before leaving for the final time in September 2019 after relocating to Morecambe.

Career statistics
Source:

A.  The "Other" column constitutes appearances and goals in the League Cup, Football League Trophy, Football League play-offs and Full Members Cup.

References

Footballers from Liverpool
English footballers
Association football fullbacks
Liverpool F.C. players
Skelmersdale United F.C. players
Bury F.C. players
Port Vale F.C. players
Rochdale A.F.C. players
Accrington Stanley F.C. players
Ashton United F.C. players
Rossendale United F.C. players
Bacup Borough F.C. players
English Football League players
Association football player-managers
English football managers
Accrington Stanley F.C. managers
Association football coaches
Port Vale F.C. non-playing staff
1954 births
Living people